Beaver Township, Ohio, may refer to:

Beaver Township, Mahoning County, Ohio
Beaver Township, Noble County, Ohio
Beaver Township, Pike County, Ohio

Ohio township disambiguation pages